HWT may refer to:

 Harvey World Travel, a former Australian travel agency franchise
 Health and welfare trust, a Canadian healthcare plan
 The Herald and Weekly Times, an Australian newspaper publishing company 
 Heritage Walk Trivandrum, an Indian non-profit organisation
 Hypersonic wind tunnel
 Herschel Walker trade, the largest player trade in the history of the U.S. National Football League
 Humanoid Walking Tank, a type of robot in the Japanese video game Gunparade March